Jutta, (ca. 1200–1260), also called Jutta of Kulmsee, Jutta of Sangerhausen, and Jutta of Thuringia, was a German aristocrat who became a hermit on the frontier of Prussia and is honored as the patron saint of that region.

She imitated the life of Elizabeth of Hungary, who was the Duchess of Thuringia during her youth, and has also been canonized a saint. She was married at the age of fifteen to a nobleman and bore children by him. She convinced her husband of, and raised her children in a contemplative and mystical form of Christianity.  He died while they were on a pilgrimage to Jerusalem, and Jutta became a single mother.  Each child eventually entered a monastery upon reaching a suitable age, and this left Jutta able to pursue a more austere religious way of life.

Jutta was born at Sangerhausen in Thuringia [now Sachsen-Anhalt], and became a member of the Third Order of St. Francis. She gave away or sold her property and lived the rest of her life in contemplation and in caring for the poor and the sick. She became a figure of ridicule among her neighbors as she carried out her service to the poor of the region.

In her last years, Jutta moved to the frontier of Christian Europe. She chose as her base a derelict building in Bildschön (now Bielczyny), near Kulmsee in Prussia, part of the Monastic State of the Teutonic Order, the area governed by the Teutonic Knights, whose Grand Master, Anno von Sangershausen, was a relative of hers. There the knights sheltered her. Visitors came to her to receive counsel and prayers, and she quickly established a reputation as a saint.  She said that there were three things that can bring one near to God: painful sickness, exile from home, and poverty voluntarily accepted for God. She dedicated her final days to praying for the non-Christian population of the region.

She died around 1260 at Kulmsee in the Monastic State of the Teutonic Order [now Chełmża, Kuyavian-Pomeranian Voivodeship, Poland. In keeping with her wishes, Archbishop Heidenreich of Kulm, earlier Archbishop of Armagh, Ireland, and now first Bishop of Kulm, had her buried at the cathedral. A cultus developed around her immediately and the Kulmsee cathedral became a destination for pilgrims.  In the Roman Catholic Church, she is honored as the patron saint of Prussia, and her feast day is observed on 5 May.

References

External links

 Brief biography from Heiligenlexikon.de (in German)

1200 births
1260 deaths
People from Sangerhausen
People from the State of the Teutonic Order
German Roman Catholic saints
German hermits
13th-century Christian saints
Franciscan hermits
Franciscan mystics
Franciscan saints
Members of the Third Order of Saint Francis
Female saints of medieval Germany
13th-century German nobility
13th-century German women
13th-century Christian mystics
Medieval German saints